Leptadapis is a genus of adapiform primate that lived in Europe during the middle Eocene. Fossils of the genus have been found in the Escanilla Formation of Spain and Egerkingen in Switzerland.

References

Bibliography 

 

Prehistoric strepsirrhines
Prehistoric primate genera
Eocene primates
Bartonian life
Eocene mammals of Europe
Paleogene Spain
Fossils of Spain
Paleogene Switzerland
Fossils of Switzerland
Fossil taxa described in 1876